Hong Soo-ah (born Hong Geun-young on June 30, 1986) is a South Korean actress. She is known for her early 2000s role in the sitcom Nonstop.

She gained the nickname "Hong Throw" in the Korean press after making a skilful ceremonial first pitch at a Doosan Bears game in Jamsil Baseball Stadium in 2005.

Hong Soo-ah has performed in a number of films and television programs and appeared on variety shows.  She left Korea to perform in Chinese dramatic roles for several years before returning to Korea in 2016 to play a lead role in the film Malice.

In 2015 the actress won the Asia Pacific Actors Network Hallyu Star award.

In June 2020, Hong signed a management contract with Glovic Entertainment, the same company behind the Channel A drama Eccentric! Chef Moon.

Filmography

Film

Television series

Television  show

Web shows

Music video

Musical theatre

Awards and nominations

References

External links

Hong Soo-ah at Glovic Entertainment

1986 births
Living people
People from Hwaseong, Gyeonggi
South Korean television actresses
South Korean film actresses
South Korean musical theatre actresses
Konkuk University alumni
21st-century South Korean actresses